Kiloware is a term for packages of postage stamps sold to stamp collectors by weight rather than by quantity, often in kilograms, hence the name. Kiloware usually consists of used stamps on paper from mail clippings, although off paper stamps may also be sold as kiloware.

Mission kiloware, or mission mixtures, are kiloware produced by charitable organizations, churches, etc., whose volunteers gather used stamps and then sell them to dealers.  Mission kiloware will normally have high duplication of common letter rate definitives, but good mission kiloware will be advertised as "unpicked", meaning the scarcer or better stamps will not have been removed from the mix, and there is at least the possibility of the collector finding good stamps for a low price.

The stamp newspaper Linn's Stamp News has a regular feature entitled "Kitchen Table Philately", in which the reviewer buys mixtures from various dealers, and analyzes what is in the mixtures, noting percentage of duplicates, oldest and newest stamps, better stamps, and concluding with a computation of the cost-to-value ratio. Typical numbers are in the 5% percent range, meaning that the stamps cost a small fraction of their price when sold individually by dealers.

References and sources

 Richard McP. Cabeen, Standard Handbook of Stamp Collecting (Collectors Club, 1979), pp. 8–9

Philatelic terminology